In Greek mythology, Asteria or Asterie is a daughter of the Titans Coeus (Polus) and Phoebe and the sister of Leto. According to Hesiod, by the Titan Perses she had a single child, a daughter named Hecate, the goddess of witchcraft. Other authors made Asteria the mother of the fourth Heracles and Hecate by Zeus.

Asteria is notable for her pursuit by the amorous god Zeus, who desired her. In order to escape him and his advances, she transformed herself into a bird and then a wandering island. When her sister Leto, impregnated by Zeus, went into labour, Asteria was the only place on earth willing to receive her, defying Hera's orders that forbade Leto any shelter. After Apollo and Artemis were born on her, the island received the name of Delos, and Apollo fixed it in place, making it his sacred land.

Etymology 
Asteria's name shares an etymology with the names of Astraeus, Asteria's first cousin, and his daughter Astraea.

Mythology 

Asteria married Perses, her first cousin, and gave birth to their only child Hecate. In one account attributed to Musaeus, Asteria is the mother of Hecate not by Perses but by Zeus. She evidently joined the other gods during the Gigantomachy, as in the Gigantomachy frieze on the Pergamon Altar, Asteria is seen fighting against the Giants next to her mother Phoebe.

Asteria was an inhabitant of Olympus, and like her sister Leto was beloved by Zeus. After Zeus had impregnated Leto, his attention was next captured by her sister Asteria. In order to escape the amorous advances of the god, who in the form of an eagle pursued her, she transformed herself into a quail (ortux) and flung herself into the Aegean Sea. It was there that Asteria metamorphosed into the island Asteria (the island which had fallen from heaven like a star) or the "quail island" Ortygia. This then became identified with the island of Delos, which was the only place on earth to give refuge to the fugitive Leto when, pregnant with Zeus's children, she was pursued by vengeful Hera. According to Hyginus, Leto was borne by the north wind Boreas at the command of Zeus to the floating island, at the time when Python was pursuing her, and there clinging to an olive, she gave birth to Apollo and Artemis.

Hera, despite being enraged that Asteria had defied her and allowed Leto to give birth to the products of Zeus' liaison, did no harm to Asteria, out of respect for her for not sleeping with Zeus when he chased her, and instead preferring the sea over him, thus not further defiling Hera's marriage. Asteria's power to withstand Hera's threats seems to stem from her parentage as the daughter of two Titans.

A different version was added by the poet Nonnus who recounted that, after Asteria was pursued by Zeus but turned herself into a quail and leapt into the sea, Poseidon instead took up the chase. In the madness of his passion, he hunted the chaste goddess to and fro in the sea, riding restless before the changing wind and thus she transformed herself into the desert island of Delos with the help of her nephew Apollo who rooted her in the waves immovable.

The element of Asteria fleeing from Zeus as the origin of Delos was probably introduced by Callimachus, as in the Homeric Hymn to Apollo, nothing in the conversation between Leto and Delos indicates of such a past for Delos, let alone that they are sisters. Like the Hymn, however, Callimachus does not allude to the kinship between Leto and Asteria either, in contrast to Hesiod, who recorded that they are sisters but did not make Asteria the origin of Delos. Asteria as Delos is already known since Pindar, but whether he would have known of the story of her trying to avoid Zeus is not clear.

In the rare account where Asteria was the mother of Heracles by Zeus, the Phoenicians sacrifice quails to the hero because when he went into Libya and was killed by Typhon, Iolaus brought a quail to him, and having put it close to him, he smelt it and came to life again.

Genealogy

See also 

 The Astra Planeta (five of Astraea's siblings)
 Nemesis
 Astraeus
 Calliste
 Aea
 Pitys
 Daphne

Notes

References 
 Athenaeus of Naucratis, The Deipnosophists or Banquet of the Learned. London. Henry G. Bohn, York Street, Covent Garden. 1854. Online version at the Perseus Digital Library.
 Athenaeus of Naucratis, Deipnosophistae. Kaibel. In Aedibus B.G. Teubneri. Lipsiae. 1887. Greek text available at the Perseus Digital Library.
 Callimachus, Callimachus and Lycophron with an English translation by A. W. Mair ; Aratus, with an English translation by G. R. Mair, London: W. Heinemann, New York: G. P. Putnam 1921. Internet Archive
 Callimachus, Works. A.W. Mair. London: William Heinemann; New York: G.P. Putnam's Sons. 1921. Greek text available at the Perseus Digital Library.
 Gaius Julius Hyginus, Fabulae from The Myths of Hyginus translated and edited by Mary Grant. University of Kansas Publications in Humanistic Studies. Online version at the Topos Text Project.
 Hesiod, Theogony from The Homeric Hymns and Homerica with an English Translation by Hugh G. Evelyn-White, Cambridge, MA.,Harvard University Press; London, William Heinemann Ltd. 1914. Online version at the Perseus Digital Library. Greek text available from the same website.
 Honan, Mary McMahon, Guide to the Pergamon Museum, De Gruyter, 1904. . Online version at De Gruyter.
 Marcus Tullius Cicero, Nature of the Gods from the Treatises of M.T. Cicero translated by Charles Duke Yonge (1812-1891), Bohn edition of 1878. Online version at the Topos Text Project.
 Marcus Tullius Cicero, De Natura Deorum. O. Plasberg. Leipzig. Teubner. 1917.  Latin text available at the Perseus Digital Library.
 Maurus Servius Honoratus, In Vergilii carmina comentarii. Servii Grammatici qui feruntur in Vergilii carmina commentarii; recensuerunt Georgius Thilo et Hermannus Hagen. Georgius Thilo. Leipzig. B. G. Teubner. 1881. Online version at the Perseus Digital Library.
 Nonnus of Panopolis, Dionysiaca translated by William Henry Denham Rouse (1863-1950), from the Loeb Classical Library, Cambridge, MA, Harvard University Press, 1940.  Online version at the Topos Text Project.
 Nonnus of Panopolis, Dionysiaca. 3 Vols. W.H.D. Rouse. Cambridge, MA., Harvard University Press; London, William Heinemann, Ltd. 1940-1942. Greek text available at the Perseus Digital Library.
 Pseudo-Apollodorus, The Library with an English Translation by Sir James George Frazer, F.B.A., F.R.S. in 2 Volumes, Cambridge, MA, Harvard University Press; London, William Heinemann Ltd. 1921. . Online version at the Perseus Digital Library. Greek text available from the same website.
 Publius Ovidius Naso, Amores edited by Christopher Marlowe, Ed. Online version at the Perseus Digital Library.
 Publius Ovidius Naso, Amores, Epistulae, Medicamina faciei femineae, Ars amatoria, Remedia amoris. R. Ehwald. edidit ex Rudolphi Merkelii recognitione. Leipzig. B. G. Teubner. 1907. Latin text available at the Perseus Digital Library.

External links 

 ASTERIA from The Theoi Project
 ASTERIA from Mythopedia
 ASTERIA from greekmythology.com

Greek goddesses
Oracular goddesses
Stellar goddesses
Titans (mythology)
Metamorphoses into birds in Greek mythology
Divine women of Zeus
Olympian deities
Deeds of Zeus
Deeds of Poseidon
Metamorphoses characters
Delos
Leto
Night goddesses
Deeds of Apollo
Metamorphoses into terrain in Greek mythology
Shapeshifters in Greek mythology